The 1964–65 Cruz Azul season was the 5th season in the football club's history as a professional team and the 1st season in the top flight of Mexican football.

The team competed in the Primera División and Copa México. Cruz Azul made his Primera División debut on 6 June 1964 against Monterrey. The club was managed by Hungarian Jorge Marik in his fourth season with the team.

Coaching staff

Competitions

Overview

Primera División

Result round by round

Matches

Copa México

Group stage
<onlyinclude>

Semifinals

Statistics

Goals

Clean sheets

Own goals

References

Cruz Azul seasons